The 1981–82 season was Manchester United's 80th season in the Football League, and their 7th consecutive season in the top division of English football.

United had finished eighth in the league the previous season, with manager Dave Sexton being sacked after his four-year spell in charge had failed to deliver a major trophy. His successor was West Bromwich Albion manager Ron Atkinson. One of Atkinson's first moves as manager was to bolster the club's attack with the £950,000 signing of Frank Stapleton from Arsenal, while the previous season's top scorer Joe Jordan was sold to AC Milan. Atkinson retained the services of Garry Birtles, who had been a disappointment in his first season with United, scoring just once in his first 28 games. Birtles had a more successful second season at Old Trafford, finding the net 11 times.

In early October, he brought midfielder Bryan Robson to Old Trafford from his former club West Bromwich Albion for a British record fee of £1.5million. He also signed fellow Albion midfielder Remi Moses for £500,000. Long-serving Northern Ireland international, Sammy McIlroy, left the club after 13 years when he signed for Stoke City in February.

After constantly leading the league during the first half of the season, United finished the season third in the league and qualified for the UEFA Cup, while the league title went to Liverpool (who surged in the second half of the season after being mid table at Christmas) and Ipswich Town finished second. Late in the season came the debut of teenage forward Norman Whiteside, who at the age of 17 was selected for the Northern Ireland squad at the FIFA World Cup. He also scored for United on the last day of the league season in only his second senior appearance for the club.

First Division

FA Cup

League Cup

Squad statistics

References

Manchester United F.C. seasons
Manchester United